is a title for Shinto gods.

It is also a Japanese surname. It can refer to:

 Myōjin Yahiko, a Rurouni Kenshin character
 Tomokazu Myojin, a Japanese footballer
 Myojin, a Japanese samurai woman
 Myojin parakaryote, an incertae sedis unicellular organism

Japanese-language surnames